The 2017 South American Under-15 Football Championship was the 8th edition of the South American Under-15 Football Championship, the biennial international youth football championship organised by the CONMEBOL for the men's under-15 national teams of South America. The tournament was held in Argentina between 5 and 19 November 2017.

Each match has a duration of 80 minutes, consisting of two halves of 40 minutes with a 15-minute half-time. Up to five substitutions may be made for each team in a match.

Host team Argentina won their first South American U-15 title by defeating the defending champions Brazil 3–2 in the final.

Teams
All ten CONMEBOL member national teams entered the tournament. Moreover, two teams from UEFA were invited to compete.

Venues
Argentina was named as host of the tournament at the 67th Ordinary CONMEBOL Congress held on 26 April 2017 in Santiago, Chile. San Juan and Mendoza were chosen as host cities and ratified by CONMEBOL on 11 October 2017.

The matches were originally scheduled to be played in two stadiums. Due to the semi-final of the Copa Argentina played at Estadio Malvinas Argentinas on 12 November 2017, two matches were moved to Estadio Víctor Antonio Legrotaglie.

Draw
The draw was held on 13 October 2017, 17:30 ART (UTC−3), at the Salón Cruce de los Andes in the Civic Center of the Province of San Juan. The 12 teams were drawn into two groups of six teams. The hosts Argentina were seeded into Group A, while the title holders Brazil were seeded into Group B. The remaining teams were seeded based on the results in the 2015 South American Under-15 Football Championship.

Squads

Players born on or after 1 January 2002 are eligible to compete in the tournament. Each team has to submit a squad of 22 players, including a minimum of three goalkeepers (Regulations Article 5.2).

Match officials
The referees and assistants referees were:

 Fernando Espinoza
Assistants: Julio Fernández and Maximiliano Del Yesso
 Ivo Méndez
Assistants: Edwar Saavedra and Reluy Vallejos
 Wagner Reway
Assistants: Alex Ang Ribeiro and Cleberson Nascimento
 Piero Maza
Assistants: Claudio Urrutia and Alejandro Molina
 Andrés Rojas
Assistants: Sebastián Vela and Miguel Roldán

 Luis Quiroz
Assistants: Ricardo Baren and Juan Aguiar
 Arnaldo Samaniego
Assistants: Robero Cañete and José Cuevas
 Joel Alarcón
Assistants: Michael Orué and Jesús Sánchez
 Esteban Ostojich
Assistants: Carlos Javier Barreiro and Martín Soppi
 Alexis Herrera
Assistants: Tulio Moreno and Alberto Ponte

Support Referees

 Facundo Tello
Assistant: Maximiliano Castelli

Group stage
The top two teams of each group advance to the semi-finals.

Tiebreakers
The teams are ranked according to points (3 points for a win, 1 point for a draw, 0 points for a loss). If tied on points, tiebreakers would be applied in the following order (Regulations Article 18.1):
Goal difference in all games;
Goals scored in all games;
Head-to-head result in games between tied teams;
Drawing of lots.

All times are local, ART (UTC−3).

Group A

Group B

Knockout stage
If tied after regulation time, extra time is not played, and the penalty shoot-out is used to determine the winner (Regulations Article 18.3).

Bracket

Semi-finals

Final

Goalscorers

References

External links
Sudamericano Sub 15 Argentina 2017, CONMEBOL.com

2017
International association football competitions hosted by Argentina
Under-15 Football Championship
2017 in Argentine football
2017 in youth association football
South American Under-15 Football